Reinado Internacional del Café 2011 beauty pageant, was held in Manizales, Colombia, on January 9, 2011. There were 22 participants. The winner was Sofinel Báez, from the Dominican Republic.

Results

Placements

Special Awards

 Queen of Water: Costa Rica
 Finalists: Chile, Spain
 Queen of Police: United States
 Finalists: Bolivia, Venezuela
 Best Face: Costa Rica
 Best Hair: Costa Rica

Official delegates

References

External links
 Instituto de Cultura y Turismo de Manizales
 Alcaldía de Manizales
 Feria de Manizales

2011
2011 beauty pageants
2011 in Colombia
January 2011 events in South America